Celtic Football Club is a Scottish professional association football club based in Parkhead, Glasgow. The club was founded in 1887 and played their first match in May 1888, a friendly match against Rangers. The club played their first competitive match in September 1888, when they entered the first round of the 1888–89 Scottish Cup, and were founding members of the Scottish Football League in 1890 from which they have remained in the top tier of ever since. Celtic have won the Scottish league title on 52 occasions, the Scottish Cup 40 times and the Scottish League Cup 20 times. The club enjoyed their greatest successes during the 1960s and 1970s under Jock Stein when they won nine consecutive league titles and the European Cup.

As of the end of the 2021–22 season, the club have played more than 123 seasons in Scottish football. The table details their achievements and the top goalscorer in senior major first-team competitions to the end of the most recently completed season. Details of the partially completed league campaign in the 1939–40 season, abandoned due to the Second World War, are also included.

History

Celtic played their first ever competitive match on 1 September 1888, a first round Scottish Cup tie against Shettleston, winning 5–1, and eventually reaching the final where they lost to Third Lanark after a replay. The team also made their debuts in the Glasgow Cup and the North-Eastern Cup that same season, reaching the semi-final of the Glasgow Cup where they lost to Queens Park, and defeating Cowlairs 6–1 in the final of the North-Eastern Cup to win their first ever trophy. The Scottish Football League was formed in 1890, and Celtic were among the founding members, finishing third behind joint-winner's Rangers and Dumbarton in the competition's inaugural season.

In 1891, Celtic won their second trophy when they beat Third Lanark 4–0 in the final of the Glasgow Cup. The following year saw Celtic winning their first major tournament, defeating Queen's Park 5–1 in the 1892 Scottish Cup Final. A first league title then followed in season 1892–93. The Glasgow Cup remained a prestigious tournament for some years, but declined in importance after the Second World War following the introduction of the Scottish League Cup and European club competitions. Celtic have since gone on to win the Scottish League Championship on 51 occasions, including a run of nine consecutive titles in the 1960s and 1970s, the Scottish Cup 40 times, and the Scottish League Cup 19 times.

Celtic first participated in European competition during the 1962–63 season, their third-place finish in the league the previous season qualifying them for the Inter-Cities Fairs Cup. They went on to reach two European Cup Winner's Cup semi-finals in 1964 and 1966, before going on to become the first British club to win the European Cup in 1967, defeating Inter Milan 2–1 in the final. Celtic reached the European Cup Final again in 1970, but lost to Feyenoord. Their last appearance in a European final was in 2003 when they lost 3–2 to FC Porto in the UEFA Cup Final.

Key

Key to league record
 Pld – Matches played
 W – Matches won
 D – Matches drawn
 L – Matches lost
 GF – Goals for
 GA – Goals against
 Pts – Points
 Pos – Final position

Key to divisions
 SFL – Scottish Football League
 SPD – Scottish Football League Premier Division
 SPL – Scottish Premier League
 SP – Scottish Premiership
 – Top scorer in division

Key to rounds
1R – 1st Round, etc.
QF – Quarter-finals
SF – Semi-finals
 – Runners-up
 – Winners

 Goals noted for Top Goalscorer comprises goals scored in League, Scottish Cup, Scottish League Cup, Glasgow Cup and European Club competitions.

Seasons
Source:

Notes

References

Seasons
 
Celtic
Seasons